Gavkaran (also Romanized as Gāvkarān, Gav Karan, and Gāv Korān) is a village in Miyan Rud Rural District, Qolqol Rud District, Tuyserkan County, Hamadan Province, Iran. At the 2006 census, its population was 144, in 23 families.

References 

Populated places in Tuyserkan County